The Pac-12 Football Championship Game is an annual college football game held by the Pac-12 Conference to determine the season's conference champion. The game from the 2011–2021 seasons had the champion of the North Division against the champion of the South Division. The inaugural game was held during the 2011 season.  Starting in 2022, the two teams with the highest conference winning percentage will face off in the championship game.

The game is scheduled to be played in Allegiant Stadium in Paradise, Nevada through 2022. In 2020, as a result of the COVID-19 pandemic, the game was hosted at the home stadium of the division winner with the better conference record, which was the Los Angeles Memorial Coliseum, home of the USC Trojans. From 2014 to 2019, the game was played at Levi's Stadium in Santa Clara, California. The first three editions were also held at the home stadium of the division winner with the better conference record: Autzen Stadium in 2011, Stanford Stadium in 2012, and Sun Devil Stadium in 2013. The game is usually held on the first Friday following the conclusion of the regular season.

The winner of the game is awarded the Pac-12 Conference's automatic berth in the Rose Bowl Game, unless the team is selected to play in the College Football Playoff (CFP), and/or in seasons where the Rose Bowl hosts a CFP semifinal.

Television broadcast rights to the game are shared by Fox Sports in even years and ESPN in most odd years, with the 2019 and 2021 editions on ABC. ESPN Radio holds the radio rights.

History

In 2011, the Pacific-10 Conference added Colorado and Utah, bringing the membership total to 12 teams and becoming the Pac-12. Consequently, the conference split into two six-team divisions and created an annual conference championship game.

In the first season of the newly expanded Pac-12 in 2011, USC finished first in the South Division with a 7–2 conference record but was ineligible to play in postseason games due to NCAA sanctions. UCLA (5–4) represented the South Division in the inaugural Pac-12 Football Championship Game as its second-place team. Oregon represented the North Division and defeated UCLA to become the conference's first football champion to be determined by a championship game.

Through the 2021 season, 9 of the 12 conference members have appeared in the Pac-12 Football Championship Game. All six teams of the South Division have made at least one appearance, while only Oregon, Stanford, Washington have represented the North Division. The North Division representatives won the first six contests and have a 9–2 overall record in the series through the 2021 season.

From 2011 through the 2021 season, the conference used to play the winner of each respective division, the South and the North against one another in the conference title game.  Starting in the 2022 season, the Pac—12 elected to have the teams with the two highest conference winning percentage regardless of division play in the conference title game.

Broadcast rights to the game are held by ESPN and Fox Sports on a 12-year deal that began in 2012, where the rights alternate between ESPN in odd years and Fox in even years. Fox broadcast the inaugural game in 2011.

Team selection criteria
From 2011 through 2021 the conference used division standings are based on each team's overall conference record to select conference title game participants. In the event there was a tie two teams finish in a tie for first place, the championship game berth went to the winner of the season's head-to-head contest between the two teams. If three or more teams were tied, the following tiebreakers were used to determine the division champion:

The following procedures will only be used to eliminate all but two teams, at which point the two-team tie-breaking procedure, head-to-head result, will be applied.
Head-to-head (best record in games among the tied teams).
Record in games played within the division.
Record against the next highest placed team in the division (based on record in all Conference games, both divisional and cross-divisional), proceeding through the division.
Record in common Conference games.
Highest ranking in the SportSource Analytics poll entering the final weekend of the regular season.

Starting in 2022 the two teams with the highest conference winning percentage will face off in the championship game.

Home/away designation
The designated "home" and "away" teams are selected using a similar procedure:

The division champion with the best conference record is designated as the home team. If the two teams are tied, the following criteria are considered.
Head-to-head result, if applicable
Record against the next highest placed common opponent in the conference (based on the record in all conference games), proceeding through the conference
Record in common conference games
Highest ranking in the SportSource Analytics poll following the final weekend of regular season games
Team with the most wins in school history

Results 
During the era of divisional play, every Pac-12 South program represented the division at least once, but USC or Utah have represented the South in 6 out of 7 seasons beginning in 2015, and only USC and Utah have ever won the Championship Game from the South. Only three schools (Oregon, Stanford, and Washington) represented the North division; each has won the Championship Game multiple times.

Results by year 
Below are the results from all Pac-12 Football Championship Games played. The winning team appears in bold font, on a background of their primary team color. Rankings are from the AP Poll released prior to the game.

 In 2011, UCLA, the second-place team in the South Division, played in place of USC, who was ineligible to participate due to NCAA sanctions.
^ In 2020, Oregon represented the North Division due to COVID-19 issues in Washington's program.

Results by team

California, Oregon State and Washington State have not yet appeared in the Pac-12 Football Championship Game.

Common matchups
Matchups that have occurred more than once:

Site selection criteria
During its first three years, the site of the Pac-12 Championship Game was the home stadium of the division champion with the superior overall conference record. In the event that the two division champions were tied, the head-to-head record would be used as the tiebreaker. If the two teams did not meet during the season, a BCS component was to be used.

After three years of the home-hosting model, the Pac-12 announced a three-year deal to host the game at the neutral site of Levi's Stadium in Santa Clara, California.  In 2017, the Pac-12 announced it would keep the game at Levi's Stadium through 2019 with an option for 2020.

On July 24, 2019, it was announced that Allegiant Stadium, then under the working name Las Vegas Stadium, would host the Pac-12 Championship Game starting in 2021.

On October 3, 2020, the Pac-12 announced that the 2020 Pac-12 Championship Game would revert to the original home-hosting model due to the COVID-19 pandemic, with the 2021 game starting the two-year run at Allegiant Stadium.

On May 18, 2022, the Pac-12 announced that starting with the 2022 edition, the two teams with the highest conference winning percentage will face off in the championship game. No changes were made to the 2022 Pac-12 schedule, which had already been set using the former divisional alignment. The conference also announced it was reviewing several potential scheduling models for future seasons.

Game records

Source:

See also
 List of NCAA Division I FBS conference championship games
 List of Pac-12 Conference football champions

References

 
Recurring sporting events established in 2011